The USA Women's 3x3 Teams are two of the teams under the auspices of the USA Basketball organization. In 2007, FIBA decided to start championships for the 3x3 event (also called three-on-three), starting in 2010. Two events are held, one for athletes under 18 years of age and one open event. The under 18 event (U18) is held every year, although in every fourth year, starting with 2010, the event is part of the Youth Olympic Games. The open events are held every other year, in even-numbered years, starting in 2012.

Tournament record

Summer Olympics

World Cup

Rules
The game includes many elements of the traditional five on five game with some exceptions: The rules listed below are the current 3x3 rules, which have changed several times since the creation of the game.

 Half-court—The game is played at a single basket, or one end of a two basket court. The game is typically played outdoors, except when weather conditions require the game to move indoors.
 Team size—a team consists of four players, only three of which are on the playing court at one time. A team can play with two players, but must start a game with three players able to play.
 Initial possession—coin flip; winner of the flip can choose to take possession at the start of the game, or at the start of a potential overtime
 Time—10 minutes. The clock runs continuously, except for timeouts.
 End of game—a game is over if one team scores 21 (or more) points, or at the end of regulation time if not tied
 In the original rules, when the scoring was different (see "Scoring" entry), the game ended at 33 points. This was reflected in the original name of 3x3, "FIBA 33".
 Overtime—first team to score two points wins. 
 Timeouts—One 30-second timeout
 Shot clock—12 seconds
 Scoring—baskets count for one point, except those beyond the arc which are worth two points. Foul shots are worth a single point.
 In the original rules, scoring was identical to that of the full-court game.
 Possession change—after a score, a steal or defensive rebound, team must dribble or pass the ball outside the arc.
 Held ball—no alternating possession rule or jump ball; the defensive team is always awarded possession.
 Free throws—One free throw on all personal fouls, except two free throws in the following situations:
 If fouled during an unsuccessful shot attempt from behind the arc.
 Opponent has committed 7 or more team fouls in the game. Team fouls 10 and greater are treated as technical fouls (see immediately below).
 Technical or unsportsmanlike fouls, after which the non-fouling team receives possession of the ball.
 Foul limit—no limit on personal fouls per player, seven per team. A player who commits two unsportsmanlike fouls is disqualified.
 Substitution procedure—player leaves the court, crossing the end line opposite the basket, and makes physical contact with the substitute. No action by table officials is required.

For rules not specifically covered in the 3x3 rule list, the FIBA rules for five on five apply.

U18 Record
 2010   6–1 3rd 
 2011   7–2 4th (honorary bronze)
 2012   7–1 1st 
 2013   8–1 1st 
 2014   9–0 1st 
 2015   7–1 2nd 
 2016   5–2 2nd 
 2017   7–0 1st 
 2018   7–0 1st

Open record
 2012   9–0 1st 
 2014   9–0 1st 
 2016   5–2 3rd 
 2018   4–1 5th

2010 U18
Kathy Richey-Walton was named to coach the U18 team selected to compete in the first ever Youth Olympic Games which was held in Singapore from August 14 to 26 2010. The players selected for the team were:
 Briyona Canty
 Andraya Carter
 Amber Henson
 Kiah Stokes

Stokes led the team in scoring in the first game against Angola. She scored 12 points, to help the team win 20–8. She went on to score 19 points in the game against the host country Singapore, helping the team to win 34–11. Henson took over the scoring leadership ant he third game, with 14 points in a 33–6 win over Germany. The USA team then went on to beat Belarus and Korea, but was challenged in the next game against Australia. The USA had a 15–7 lead, but Australia tied the game in regulation and went on to win in overtime. The final game was against Canada for the bronze medal. Canty was the scoring leader with 15 points, and the USA won 34–16 to secure the bronze medal finish.

2011 U18
Following the inaugural 3x3 event at the Youth Olympics, in 2011, FIBA held the first 3x3 U18 (Youth) World Championship For Women. The event was held in Rimini, Italy, September 9–11, 2011. The teams no longer had coaches, but did have USA Basketball representative as a team leader. Jamie Carey served as the team leader in 2011. The players selected for the team were:

 Kaela Davis
 Rebecca Greenwell
 Linnae Harper
 Taya Reimer

The USA team won their first three games easily, reaching 21 points before the opposition reached double-digits. However, in the third game, against Guam, Reimer injured her right ankle and was unable to play in any further contests. With only four players, this meant the remaining three players had to play all minutes without a substitution. The next game was against Italy, and the USA team won, but by a much closer score than in  previous contests, 16–13. The three-player team then took on and defeated Sweden and India. This qualified them for the medal rounds. In the quarterfinals against the Czech Republic, the game went to double-overtime, but the USA team emerged victorious with a 25–23 win.

The win sent the team to the semi-finals against Italy, a team the USA had defeated in a close match earlier. However, less than two minutes into the game, Greenwell suffered a knee injury. The game was delayed for 90 minutes, but Greenwell was unable to continue. The game was restarted, with the USA team fielding only two players against Italy's three players. Despite the handicap, the USA team took the game to overtime, but lost in the sudden death period. The team was scheduled to play against Japan for the bronze medal, but forfeited due to the injuries and finished in fourth place. A team can finish with two players, but must have three players to start a game. FIBA decided to award the team honorary bronze medals to recognize the effort.

2012 Open
The first FIBA 3x3 World Championship For Women was held in Athens, Greece, August 23–26, 2012. The original team chosen to represent the USA included:
 Skylar Diggins
 Bria Hartley
 Chiney Ogwumike
 Alyssa Thomas

However, Thomas was unable to compete, so she was replaced by Ann Strother Strother was in nursing school. but had participated in the 3x3 tournament on a different team. She had planned a vacation for  the time period of the world tournament, so was able to accept the request to play as a replacement player.

The USA won their first five games easily to advance to the knockout round. They then defeated Estonia to move into the quarterfinals with Hungary. They defeated Hungary easily and faced Australia in the semi-final. The Aussies gave them their toughest challenge to date, but the USA team held on to win 19–18. They faced France in the goal medal game and fell behind, but came back to win a close game 17–16 to win the first ever gold medal in the 3x3 open event.

2012 U18
After the first event, FIBA decided that the U18 event would be held on an annual basis. The second FIBA 3x3 U18 (Youth) World Championship For Women was held in Alcobendas, Spain, September 28–30, 2012. The team which qualified for the event had the following players:
 Kaela Davis
 Diamond DeShields
 Erica McCall
 Brianna Turner

Davis was the only player with prior experience in international competition. The games are intended to be played outdoors, but rain forced the games indoors for the first two days. The USA team won their first four games easily. In the second match of the second day, the USA faced China. Both DeShields and Davis fouled out, leaving McCall and Turner to play two on three. They took the game to overtime, but fell to China 13–12. Despite the loss, the team was still the number one seed for the medal rounds.

The USA faced Estonia in the quarterfinals, and won 21–15. This set up a semi-final game against Australia, which the USA team won 21–13. The gold medal game was against the host team, Spain. Although Spain scored first, the USA team took a lead and never relinquished it, winning the game 21–13 to win the first ever gold medal for the US in U18 3x3 event.

2013 U18
The third FIBA 3x3 U18 (Youth) World Championship For Women was held in Jakarta, Indonesia, September 26–29, 2013. The team which qualified for the event had the following players:
 Gabby Green
 Arike Ogunbowale
 Katie Lou Samuelson
 Brianna Turner

Turner was a repeat team member from the 2012 team. The USA team started strong, giving up only two points each to Guam and Puerto Rico, winning each game 21–2. The third game was against China, who proved a stronger opponent. China was hitting outside shots, worth two points, and late in the game the score was tied at 15 points each. Then Ogunbowale scored three points on a basket a foul shot and a basket to give the USA team the lead. She then passed to Turner inside to push the score to the final score 19–16. In their next game the USA team lost to Lithuania 11–9. The team bounced back with a win over Spain. In the first knock-out round, the USA team beat Thailand 21–14 to reach the quarterfinals. France was the opponent in the quarterfinals, and proved a tough competitor. The USA won by only two points, 17–15. That set up a semi-final match against Spain, which the USA team won 15–10. The gold medal game was against Estonia, who came into the game with the same record as the USA 7–1. The USA won 21–12 to win the gold medal.

2014 Open
The second FIBA 3x3 World Championship For Women was held in Moscow, Russia, June 5–8, 2015. The players for the USA team were:
 Cierra Burdick
 Sara Hammond
 Jewell Loyd
 Tiffany Mitchell
The USA team started pool play strong, winning each of the first five games by at least a 10-point margin. Only Argentina and Spain were within ten points. The USA then defeated Uruguay 19–6 to earn a place in the medal rounds. France proved to be a tough opponent, but the USA team prevailed 12–9. In the semi-final game, USA faced Belgium and came away with the win, 18–14. The gold medal game was against the host team, Russia, and the USA won 15–8 to finish undefeated and take home the gold medal.

2014 U18

The U18 event in 2014 was held as part of the Youth Olympic Games held in Nanjing, China, August 16–28, 2014.
 
The players for the USA team were:
 De'janae Boykin
 Napheesa Collier
 Arike Ogunbowale
 Katie Lou Samuelson

Samuelson turned an ankle prior to the event, so was unable to play in some games, and had limited minutes in others. This mean the remaining three player had to play without substitution in some matches. Despite that, the team started out well. The USA team started with a 21–3 win over Romania, followed by victories over Indonesia, Egypt, and Thailand. Samuelson was able to play in the game against Belgium hitting five of six field goal attempts.

On Thursday, August 21, a shoot-out contest was held. Samuelson placed third out of 158 contestants, winning a bronze medal.

After the individual events, the USA team continued to win. Samuelson was able to play, though with limited court time in some of the remaining games. The USA team beat Estonia in the quarterfinal 21–12, then Hungary in the semi-final 21–14. This set up the gold medal match against the undefeated Netherlands team, which the USA team won 19–10, to end the event with a perfect 9–0 record.

2015 U18 
The U18 event in 2015 was held in Debrecen, Hungary, June 4–7, 2015.

The players for the USA team were:
 Kristine Anigwe
 Natalie Chou
 Erin Boley
 Arike Ogunbowale
Asia Durr played on the Defend team, which won 2015 USA Basketball 3×3 U18 National Tournament along with the right to represent the US at the World Championships, but she suffered a muscle injury, and had to withdraw. She was replaced by Erin Boley, a player on the Southern Starz team, and the winner of the qualifying tournament MVP award.

After winning their opening game against Switzerland in overtime, the USA team went on to win their next six games. They were undefeated entering the gold medal game against France. The USA team had a 12–9 lead halfway through the game, but France responded with a 9–3. The USA team tied the game twice, but France hit a free throw with 17 seconds left in the game to win 20–19, and earn the gold medal. The USA finished second, earning the silver medal.

2016 Open 
The third FIBA 3x3 World Championship For Women was held in Guanzhou, China, June 5–8, 2015. Team USA won Group C and their quarterfinal game. They would lose in the semi-finals to the Czech Republic, but rebound to win the bronze medal. The roster for 2016 was:

Linnae Harper
Alexis Jennings
Natalie Romeo
Chatrice White

2016 U18 
The U18 event in 2016 was held in Astana, Kazakhstan, June 5–8, 2016.

The players for the USA team were:
 Jaelyn Brown
 Sidney Cooks
 Amber Ramirez
 Megan Walker
In the opening game against the Netherlands, the USA team led early and held an 8–5 lead after four minutes. The Netherlands then began to hit baskets and outscored the USA 8–1 to take a four-point lead with under four minutes to go and continued on to the 21–13 win. The USA played later in the day against Poland and won 21–15. The USA then won their next four games which qualified them for the championship game against France, who led most of the way, with as much as a nine-point lead at one time. The USA cut the lead to six but France scored three more points to win the game 21–12. France won the gold medal while the USA earned a silver medal for the second year in a row.

2017 U18 
The U18 event in 2017 was held in Chengdu, China from June 28 to July 2, 2017.

The players for the USA team were:
 Aquira DeCosta
 Destiny Littleton
 Christyn Williams
 Janelle Bailey
Team USA defeated the Czech Republic to win the gold medal.

2018 Open 
The 2018 World Cup was held in Bocaue, Philippines from June 8–12, 2018. Team USA won Group C, but lost their quarterfinal game to Italy. They would finish in 5th place.

For this event, Team USA consists of four University of Oregon players who had won the 2018 US open women's championship that April:
 Erin Boley
 Otiona Gildon
 Ruthy Hebard
 Sabrina Ionescu

2018 U18
The U18 event in 2018 was held as part of the Youth Olympic Games held in Buenos Aires, Argentina, October 7–17, 2018.
 
The players for the USA team were:
 Aliyah Boston
 Samantha Brunelle
 Paige Bueckers
 Hailey van Lith

The team won every game in pool play to take a 4–0 record into the knock-out round. They beat the Netherlands in the quarterfinal game 18–14, then China in the semi-final 21–9. This set up the gold medal match against France, which the USA team won 18–4, to end the event with a perfect 9–0 record.

2020 Olympics
The Olympic event in 2021 was held as part of the 2020 Olympic Games held in Tokyo, Japan, July 24–28, 2021.
 
The players for the USA team were:
 Stefanie Dolson
 Allisha Gray
 Kelsey Plum
 Jackie Young

Young was a late replacement to the team after Katie Lou Samuelson contracted COVID-19 just prior to the start of the games. The team won all but one game in pool play to take a 6–1 record into the knock-out round. They beat France in the semi-final 18–16, which set up the gold medal match against ROC. The USA team won that match 18–15 to win the first ever gold medal at an Olympic Games 3x3 basketball tournament.

See also
 USA Basketball
 United States women's national basketball team
 United States women's national under-19 basketball team
 United States women's national under-17 basketball team
 United States men's national 3x3 team
 3x3 basketball

References

External links

3x3
Women's national 3x3 basketball teams